Hapithus melodius, the musical bush cricket, is a species of bush cricket in the family Gryllidae. It is found in North America.

References

Further reading

 
 

Hapithinae
Insects described in 1977